The 2012 Latvian Higher League was the 21st season of top-tier football in Latvia. It began on 24 March 2012 and ended on 10 November 2012.  FK Ventspils are the defending champions.

The league comprised ten teams, one more than in the previous season.

Teams
The league returned to a ten-team circuit after having been forced to play the 2011 season with only nine teams, following the withdrawal of SK Blāzma a few weeks before the season commenced. As a consequence of the Blāzma withdrawal, no team was directly relegated.

2011 Latvian First League champions FS METTA/Latvijas Universitāte from Riga were directly promoted. The team, which was founded by the METTA football school and the University of Latvia in 2007, entered the Higher League for the first time in their history.

JFK Olimps/RFS finished the 2011 season in ninth place and were therefore required to compete in a two-legged promotion/relegation play-off against First Division runners-up Spartaks Jūrmala. Spartaks won the play-off 4–1 on aggregate and were therefore promoted to the Higher League. Similar to METTA/LU, they made their debut at the highest level of the Latvian football pyramid. Accordingly, Olimps/RFS were relegated to the First League after five seasons at the top flight.

Stadiums and locations

Following the promotion of FK Spartaks, the city of Jūrmala should have featured three clubs during the 2012 season, one more than the capital, Riga, but FK Jūrmala-VV moved to Riga, changing their name to Daugava Riga.

Personnel and kits
Note: Flags indicate national team as has been defined under FIFA eligibility rules. Players and Managers may hold more than one non-FIFA nationality.

Managerial changes

Broadcasting 
Just as last season most of the matches were transmitted live via sportacentrs.com online and Sportacentrs' TV channel. In June 2012 broadcasting rights were also bought by the English company Bet365. Since 2012 league's homepage futbolavirsliga.lv has been active and since September 2012 this website has been accompanied by InStat Football system, showing information and analysis of each match individually. Since October 2012 Virslīga has also had its own analytical broadcast after each round of matches, with football experts discussing the games and future events connected to Latvian football. It's transmitted via  TV.

League table

Relegation play-offs
The 9th-placed sides will face the runners-up of the 2012 Latvian First League in a two-legged play-off, with the winner being awarded a spot in the 2013 Higher League competition. The dates and exact sequence of these matches are still to be determined.

Results

Season statistics

Top scorers

Player of the Month

Manager of the Month

Team of the Tournament

LFF version

Sportacentrs.com version

Awards

References

External links
 Latvian Football Federation 

Latvian Higher League seasons
1
Latvia
Latvia